Atomopteryx doeri is a moth in the family Crambidae. It was described by Walsingham in 1891. It is found in Brazil.

References

Moths described in 1891
Spilomelinae
Moths of South America